In economics, a false economy is an action that does save money at the beginning but which, over a longer period of time, results in more money being spent or wasted than being saved. For example, it may be false economy if a city government decided to purchase the cheapest automobiles for use by city workers to save money; however, if cheap automobiles have a record of needing more frequent repairs, the additional repair costs would eradicate any initial savings.

Motivating factors on the part of the party engaging in a false economy may be linked to the long-term involvement of this party. For example, a real estate developer who builds a condominium may turn the finished structure over to the ensuing condominium corporation which is run by its members once the last unit is sold and the building has passed a final inspection. Longevity of the components of the structure beyond the final turnover of the facility may not be a major motivating factor for the developer, meaning that the result of the application of false economies may be more detrimental to the end user, as opposed to the developer.

Individuals may also practise false economy in their personal lives. A notable practitioner of false economy was King Frederick William I of Prussia, who was said by Thomas Macaulay to have saved five or six reichsthalers a year by feeding his family unwholesome cabbages even though the poor diet sickened his children and the resulting medical care cost him many times what he saved.

Some examples of potential false economies include: 

 Purchasing cheaper products that don't last as long or may require more maintenance than the more expensive alternatives (buying cheap shoes, cheap paint, cheap automobiles);
 Paying just the minimum amount on a credit card bill each month;
 Purchasing counterfeit consumer goods;
 Choosing to not have your vehicle serviced on time;
 Opting to take the DIY approach for home projects rather than hiring a professional.

All these examples save the consumer some amount of money in the short-run, however could end up costing the consumer more further down the road.

The concept is related to planned obsolescence, whereby the lower initial cost of a product attracts buyers mostly on the basis of low cost, but who may later be at a disadvantage if the product becomes obsolete early.

Those in poverty often opt into false economies when they perceive that they can't afford the better long-term option in the short-term.

See also

Total cost of ownership
Planned obsolescence
Boots theory

References

External links

 Avoiding False Economies article
 False economies do more harm to children in care, The Independent, June 1, 2012
 The False Economy of Cheap Knockoffs – Cheaper Isn’t Always Better, Wired, October 24, 2011

Microeconomics
Ethically disputed business practices